The 2019 European Judo Championships were held in Minsk, Belarus from 22 to 25 June 2019 during the 2019 European Games.

Medal overview

Men

Women

Mixed events

Medal table

Participating nations

References

External links
 
 Judo at the 2019 European Games
 Contest Sheet
 Team results

European Judo Championships
 
European Judo Championships
European Judo Championships
Sports competitions in Minsk
International sports competitions hosted by Belarus
European Judo Championships
Judo
Judo at the European Games